{{Infobox person
| name = Lester Speight
| image = Lester Speight 2016.png
| caption = Speight in 2016
| birth_date = 
| birth_place = Baltimore, Maryland, United States 
| death_date =
| death_place =
| alma_mater  = Morgan State University
| years_active = 1991–1998 (wrestling)1997–present (acting)
| other_names = 
| occupation = Football player, wrestler, actor
| known_for = Terry Tate: Office LinebackerMy Wife and KidsGears of War| module = 
}}
Lester Speight (born August 28, 1963), also known as Rasta, is a former American football player who has had subsequent careers as a professional wrestler and then actor. He achieved significant recognition for his portrayal of Terry Tate: Office Linebacker in a series of Reebok commercials that debuted during Super Bowl XXXVII, and received further recognition for his portrayal of Augustus Cole in the Gears of War series of video games.

Early life, family and education
Lester Speight was born in Baltimore, Maryland, the son of Gussie Watson and Walter Speight. He graduated from Old Mill High School in Millersville, Maryland in 1981, where he is in its Hall of Fame for three sports: football, track, and basketball.

He attended Morgan State University from 1981 to 1985 and was a Division 1 All-American Linebacker.

Professional football and professional wrestling
After graduating college in 1985, he attempted to play in the NFL but did not. He tried out for the United States Football League (USFL) the same year. During tryouts, he ran the 40-yard dash in 4.3 seconds, which received attention of the Baltimore Stars. Speight and business manager/cousin Butch Groover negotiated a two-year deal with the Stars for more than $200,000. However, the USFL folded before he even played one season.

Speight moved on to professional wrestling working for Global Wrestling Federation and Catch Wrestling Association as Rasta the Voodoo Man. However, by 1997 he quit wrestling to pursue an acting career.

Acting career

Speight began his acting career in minor roles in many films including the football film Any Given Sunday, 13 Moons and as the club doorman in Cradle 2 the Grave. He has also appeared in many television shows such as Malcolm in the Middle, Walker, Texas Ranger, NYPD Blue, Arli$$, My Wife and Kids, and NCIS: Los Angeles.

Commercials
In 2003, Speight starred in the Terry Tate: Office Linebacker ad for Reebok that became an immediate pop-culture phenomenon and is considered among the funniest and most memorable Super Bowl commercials of all time. The exposure from the popular spot opened the door to further opportunities in film,  television and video games.

Television
Following the success of Terry Tate, Speight had a recurring role on Damon Wayans' ABC series My Wife and Kids as Calvin Scott, the father of Vanessa Scott. Speight guest-starred as prison inmate Banks on the show Prison Break. Speight appeared in an episode of ESPN's Mayne Street comedy short. In the 2008 TV film Ring of Death, Speight played convict "Milton Kennedy", a feared and revered gang boss (nicknamed "The President"), and undefeated champion of an underground fighting tournament in a notorious prison. In 2009, Speight appeared in an episode of Bones, "Double Trouble in the Panhandle", where he played the Traveling Circus' strongman, Magnum.

Film
Speight had a small role in the film Bachelor Party Vegas, as Gold Tooth, a prison rapist in 2006, before joining the Eddie Murphy motion picture Norbit as Blue, one of the three brothers of Rasputia, in 2007. The next year, he appeared in Harold & Kumar Escape from Guantanamo Bay, as a character who is interrogated using racist methods. In 2011, Speight played "Hardcore" Eddie in the Michael Bay blockbuster Transformers: Dark of the Moon.

Video games
For the 2006 Xbox 360 game Gears of War, Speight voiced the role of former "Thrashball" player Augustus Cole (a.k.a. Cole Train), humorously re-using some of his characteristic lines. He won the G-Phoria '07 award for Best Voiceover. Speight later reprised the role for Gears of War 2 (2008), Gears of War 3 (2011), Gears of War: Judgment (2013), Gears of War 4 (2016), Gears 5 (2019), and Gears Tactics (2020).

Filmography
Films
1993: The Meteor Man - Gang Member #1
1999: International Khiladi - Gang Member
1999: Any Given Sunday - Sharks' Security Guard
2002: 13 Moons - Vincent
2003: Cradle 2 the Grave - Chambers Club Doorman
2006: Bachelor Party Vegas - Gold Tooth
2007: Norbit - Blue Latimore
2007: Who's Your Caddy - Hardcore Inmate
2008: Harold & Kumar Escape from Guantanamo Bay - Dr. Jonavan White
2008: Finding Amanda - Black guy #1
2008: Ring of Death - The President
2008: Unemployed - Jacker #1
2010: Something like a Business - Rockstone
2010: Knucklehead - Redrum
2010: Faster - Hovis Nixon/Baphomet
2011: Peep World - Wizdom
2011: Transformers: Dark of the Moon - Hardcore Eddy
2014: Marvel One-Shot: All Hail the King - Herman
2014: My Dad's a Soccer Mom2017: Speech & DebateTV Series
2000: Walker, Texas Ranger - Flash Armstrong (Episode: The Avenging Angel)
2003-2005: My Wife and Kids - Calvin Scott
2003: NYPD Blue - Steve (Episode: Cops and Robbers)
2003: Malcolm in the Middle - Samuel (Episode: Long Drive)
2007: Prison Break - Inmate (Episode: John Doe)
2009: Bones - Magnum (Episode: Double Trouble in the Panhandle)
2009: Cold Case - Virgil 'Sticky' Jones (Episode: Read Between the Lines)
2015: Scorpion - Ten-Ton (Episode: Fish Filet)
2016: In the Cut - Gordon (Episode: Jailbreak)
2017: NCIS: Los Angeles - Max 'Champ' Champion (Episode: Queen Pin)
2017: The Mick - Dominic (Episode: The Visit)
2018: Titans - Clayton Williams/Mr. Atlas (Episode: Jason Todd)

Video games
2006: Gears of War - Augustus Cole
2008: Gears of War 2 - Augustus Cole
2011: Gears of War 3 - Augustus Cole
2013: Gears of War: Judgment - Augustus Cole
2016: Gears of War 4 - Augustus Cole
2019: Gears 5'' - Augustus Cole

Other
 Kimberly-Clark Healthy Workplace project (2012) - Eugene Hammer
 "Bring It On" music video by Kasland - Augustus "Cole Train" Cole

References

External links

Lester Speight at MobyGames 
ESPN's "Twist of Tate" article
Lester Speight plays HUGH on Rockville, CA

Living people
Players of American football from Baltimore
African-American players of American football
African-American male professional wrestlers
American male television actors
American male video game actors
Morgan State Bears football players
American male professional wrestlers
1963 births
21st-century African-American people
20th-century African-American sportspeople